Ogunkoya is a surname. Notable people with the surname include:

Falilat Ogunkoya (born 1968), Nigerian athlete
Seun Ogunkoya (born 1977), Nigerian sprinter
Kola Ogunkoya (born 1967), Nigerian musician
 

Surnames of Nigerian origin